Anthony Anderson (born August 15, 1970) is an American actor, comedian and game show host. He is best known for his leading roles in comedy series such as Andre "Dre" Johnson on Black-ish, drama series such as Marlin Boulet on K-Ville, and as NYPD Detective Kevin Bernard on the NBC crime drama Law & Order and comedy sitcom television series Guys with Kids. He had major roles in feature films such as Me, Myself & Irene (2000), Kangaroo Jack (2003), Agent Cody Banks 2: Destination London (2004), The Departed (2006), Transformers (2007), and Scream 4 (2011).

Anderson is also a regular judge on Food Network's Iron Chef America and also has more roles on other television programs such as All About the Andersons, The Bernie Mac Show, and The Shield. Since June 2016, he has served as host of the ABC version of the game show To Tell the Truth. In addition, he has served as a guest panelist for various game shows.

Early life
Anderson was born in Compton, California. His mother, Doris (née Hancox), was a telephone operator and actress, and his stepfather, Sterling Bowman, was a native of Little Rock, Arkansas, who moved to Los Angeles to work in the steel mill industry before opening a chain of three clothing stores. He has a half-brother, Derrick Bowman. His stepfather died in 2002. Growing up, Anderson's nickname was "Tugga" because he could not pronounce sugar. According to a DNA analysis, Anderson descends from the Bubi people of Bioko Island (Equatorial Guinea), and from the Tikar, Hausa, and Fulani people of Cameroon.

Anderson has stated that his first attempt at stand-up comedy was a failure. Although this experience was a blow to his ego, he met his future friend and fellow comedic actor Guy Torry there, who consoled him after the show and encouraged him to keep getting up on stage. He and Guy later acted together in the Eddie Murphy film titled Life. Anderson is an alumnus of the Hollywood High School Performing Arts Magnet's Class of 1988 and graduated from Howard University with a Bachelor of Fine Arts degree in 2022.

Career

His television work includes a lead role in the teen series Hang Time as Teddy Broadis. He had many one-off and guest roles on major series such as NYPD Blue, Malcolm & Eddie, In the House, and Ally McBeal. Recurring roles were on several series such as 'Til Death and The Bernie Mac Show. He was the central character in the short-lived series All About the Andersons, which lasted for one season on The WB. Anderson joined the cast of the long-running NBC crime drama television series, Law & Order in 2008. After three seasons (18, 19, and 20) as Kevin Bernard, he reprised the role upon the series's revival in 2022, concurrent with the final episodes of Black-ish. Before his work in Law & Order, he starred in two other crime series, Fox's K-Ville (as one of the lead characters) and Fox's cable channel FX's The Shield.

Anderson's series Eating America with Anthony Anderson was a summer show in 2014. He visited different towns in America that host "food festivals" highlighting a specific type of food. He was a frequent judge on Iron Chef America, and was one of the few judges to taste dishes from all the Iron Chefs on the show. In the Ultimate Bar Food battle, he served as bartender/sous-chef for Iron Chef Bobby Flay opposite Masaharu Morimoto and fellow judge Simon Majumdar.

In 2013, Anderson signed on to host the celebrity-driven, family game show called Wall of Fame which was produced by Endemol USA for NBC. One family attempts to answer pop culture trivia questions while also guessing whether members of the celebrity "Wall of Fame" answered the same questions correctly. Eight one-hour episodes were taped at the time, however, the series was never aired. He also starred in the sitcom Guys with Kids, which lasted a single season.

In 2014, Anderson began starring as Andre "Dre" Johnson on the ABC sitcom Black-ish, which completed its eight-season run in 2022. During its run Anderson received 11 Primetime Emmy Award nominations and three Golden Globe Award nominations. In 2022, Anderson was not nominated as a producer or actor for its final season. He reacted to the news while guest hosting Jimmy Kimmel Live! joking, "Can you believe that shit? Now I'm not saying the voters were stupid for not nominating me or Black-ish or Tracee, I'm just saying they're racist."

He also serves as executive producer on its spinoffs Grown-ish, which premiered on Freeform in 2018, and Mixed-ish, which ran on ABC for two seasons from 2019 to 2021. He also played Dre in episodes of both series.

Since 2016, he has been the host of To Tell the Truth, which also airs on ABC. In 2002, he voiced Ray Ray in an episode of the Disney Channel animated series The Proud Family. He will reprise the role in an episode of the second season of its revival series The Proud Family: Louder and Prouder, airing in 2023.

In October of 2022, Anderson and his mother Doris began filming Anthony Anderson and Mom: European Vacation to be aired on the E! nework.

In March 2023, it was announced that Anderson will be a lead in ABC's upcoming comedy series Public Defender.

Film
Anderson has worked as an actor since his film debut in Liberty Heights, often in comedic roles. Among his more prominent feature films are: Kangaroo Jack, which was one of his first films as a leading actor; My Baby's Daddy; Hustle & Flow; Agent Cody Banks 2: Destination London; and King's Ransom, which to date is his only starring role. Anderson had a small role in the Academy Award-winning Martin Scorsese film The Departed. Additionally, Anderson had a supporting role in Scary Movie 3 and Scary Movie 4. He was originally set to return in Scary Movie 5 with Regina Hall and Kevin Hart. In June 2010, he was cast in a minor role in Scream 4.

Directorial work
In 2009, Anderson directed a one-minute short film featuring his Law & Order co-star Jeremy Sisto. The short was made for the Responsibility Project, a joint initiative of NBC and Liberty Mutual Group. The short aired during the In The House episode "Reality Bites" on October 16, 2009.

Personal life
He has been married to his wife Alvina since September 1999. They have two children. Their son Nathan starred as Tahj in the Netflix sitcom Richie Rich and guest starred in Black-ish. His wife filed for divorce in September 2015, after having been separated since April 2014. However, the couple reconciled in January 2017 and she withdrew her petition. She filed for divorce for the second time on March 25, 2022.

Anderson has Type 2 diabetes and has been active in diabetes awareness.

Playing for the Alzheimer's Association, in 2011, Anderson won $250,000 on Who Wants to Be a Millionaire.

Anderson is an honorary member of Omega Psi Phi fraternity; he was inducted on July 30, 2020.

Rape and sexual assault allegations
Anderson was accused of raping a 25-year-old extra in a trailer on the film set of Hustle & Flow on July 27, 2004. The alleged victim accused Anderson and assistant director Wayne Witherspoon of forcibly removing her clothing, photographing her naked body, and digitally penetrating her. A witness claimed to have heard the alleged victim's screams and to have seen her run naked from the trailer, and she was treated at St. Francis Hospital. The charges were dropped on October 6, 2004, because the judge ruled that there was no probable cause to try the case.

Anderson was sued for sexual assault in September 2004 by another woman who claimed that Anderson made sexually suggestive remarks and then assaulted her in his dressing room on the set of All About the Andersons.
 
On July 20, 2018, it was revealed that he was being investigated by the Los Angeles Police Department for another sexual assault allegation. Due to lack of evidence on September 4, the Los Angeles District Attorney's Office decided not to press charges against Anderson.

Filmography

Film

Television

Video games

Music videos

Awards and nominations

References

External links

1970 births
20th-century American male actors
20th-century American comedians
21st-century American male actors
African-American male actors
American male film actors
American male television actors
American male video game actors
American male voice actors
American people of Bubi descent
American people of Cameroonian descent
American people of Equatoguinean descent
American people of Fulbe descent
American people of Hausa descent
American people of Tikar descent
Howard University alumni
Living people
Male actors from California
Male actors from Los Angeles
People from Compton, California
20th-century African-American people
21st-century African-American people
American game show hosts
Tikar people